Saginaw Career Complex (SCC) is a public vocational education center for Saginaw County located at 2102 Weiss Street in Saginaw, Michigan and part of the Saginaw Public School District. The school offers 19 programs that help students prepare for college, technical work, or skilled entry-level work. Students from high schools throughout Saginaw County are eligible to attend, and generally do so while continuing to attend classes at their home high school.

Feeder schools
Students from high schools around Saginaw County are eligible to attend the Saginaw Career Complex, and generally do so while continuing to take classes at their home high school. Home school students from Saginaw County may also be eligible.

The complex's feeder schools include:

References

External links
 

Public high schools in Michigan
Schools in Saginaw County, Michigan
Saginaw Intermediate School District
Vocational education in the United States